Anna Alexandrovna Kublikova (born 2 December 1998) is a Russian-born retired ice dancer who competed for Belarus. With Yuri Hulitski, she is the 2018 Open d'Andorra silver medalist and the 2019 Belarusian national champion. They competed at the 2019 World Championships and the 2019 European Championships.

Career 
Kublikova began competing with Yuri Hulitski for Belarus during the 2017–18 season. They made their international debut at the 2017 CS Minsk-Arena Ice Star where they finished 12th. They competed at the 2017 Volvo Open Cup where they finished 7th. They then competed at the 2017 CS Warsaw Cup where they finished 11th. Next, they competed at the 2017 CS Golden Spin of Zagreb where they finished 16th. They won a silver medal at the Belarusian national championships behind Viktoria Kavaliova and Yurii Bieliaiev.

They began the 2018-19 season by placing 10th at the 2018 CS Ondrej Nepela Trophy. Then they finished 4th at the 2018 Ice Star. Next, they won their first international medal by winning the silver medal at the 2018 Open d'Andorra. They competed at the 2018 CS Golden Spin of Zagreb where they finished 11th. They won the gold medal at the 2019 Belarusian national championships.  Next, they finished 4th at the 2019 Mentor Toruń Cup. They then competed at the 2019 Open Ice Mall Cup where they finished 7th. The 2019 European Championships in Minsk were their first major international competition, and they finished 18th. They then competed at the 2019 World Championships in Saitama, Japan, and they placed 22nd in the short program, but only the top 20 teams qualified for the free skate.

Competitive highlights 
CS: Challenger Series

With Hulitski

References

External links 

 

Belarusian female ice dancers
1998 births
Living people
Figure skaters from Minsk
Sportspeople from Kirov, Kirov Oblast